GM Powertrain Flint North (GMPT Flint North) was a General Motors automobile engine and components plant located at the Stewart Avenue exit of I-475 in Flint, Michigan . The plant consisted of several factories that combine to make the Flint North Powertrain plant.  The  plant opened in 1905 as part of the Buick Motor Company, and was the last part of Buick City standing. It was replaced by Flint Engine South. 

The engine plant (Factory 36) portion of Powertrain Flint North closed in 2008. It is famous for building the GM 3800 engine, one of the longest-produced automobile engines in history.  The remaining factories (05, 9, 10, 14, 25, 29, 75 and 81) which compose the maintenance, sanitation and components producing buildings of the plant, closed permanently on December 6, 2010. The factory received cast engine blocks from Defiance Foundry in Defiance, Ohio and Saginaw Metal Casting Operations in Saginaw, Michigan.  The employees of Powertrain Flint North were represented by UAW Local 599.

See also
 List of GM factories
 List of GM engines

References

General Motors factories
Economy of Flint, Michigan
Motor vehicle assembly plants in Michigan
Buildings and structures in Flint, Michigan
1905 establishments in Michigan
2010 disestablishments in Michigan